This is a list of St Kilda Football Club players who have made one or more appearances in the Australian Football League (AFL), known as the Victorian Football League (VFL) until 1990. St Kilda were one of the foundation clubs for the inaugural VFL season in 1897.

St Kilda Football Club players

1890s

1900s

1910s

1920s

1930s

1940s

1950s

1960s

1970s

1980s

1990s

2000s

2010s

2020s

Listed players yet to make their debut for St Kilda

See also
List of St Kilda Football Club coaches

References
AFL Tables – All Time Player List – St Kilda

Players

St Kilda
St Kilda Football Club players